SETI@home beta, is a hibernating volunteer computing project using the Berkeley Open Infrastructure for Network Computing (BOINC) platform, as a test environment for future SETI@home projects:

 AstroPulse is a volunteer computing project searching for primordial black holes, pulsars, and ETI. AstroPulse clients have been tested by this project for nearly 6 years. It is already running on SETI@home, testing new GPU/CPU optimized apps and performing other tasks.
 SETI Southern Hemisphere Search, which is another SETI@home project that was due to join BOINC. It was expected that this project would use a slightly modified version of the SETI enhanced client, as the Parkes Observatory has a feedhorn with more beams than the Arecibo Observatory.

Applications Testing
11 Dec 2008, CUDA applications test
3 Jun 2013, SETI@home v7 test
01 Dec 2015 SETI@home v8 test

External links

References

Science in society
Free science software
Volunteer computing projects
Science software for macOS
Science software for Linux
Science software for Windows
Software that uses wxWidgets